Ranni-Perinad Weir is a diversion dam built in Kakkad river which is a tributory of Pamba River at 
Mampara in  Ranni-Perinad villages of Pathanamthitta district of Kerala, India. The weir is a concrete-gravity type and is a part of Ranni – Perinad Small Hydro Electric Project, a run off the river scheme in Kakkad river in Pamba basin. It envisages the development of power by utilizing the tail race water from the Maniyar Power house, with installed capacity of 4.0 MW ( 2x 2.0 MW). The release of the water from the dam is to Kakkad river which in turn flows and joins Pamba river and flows through Taluks such as Ranni, Konni, Kozhencherry, Thiruvalla, Chengannur, Kuttanadu, Mavelikara and  Karthikappally. 
 The Dam is also a part of Ranni-Perinad Water supply scheme.

Specifications
Latitude : 9⁰ 21′ 00 ” N	
Longitude: 76⁰ 52′ 00” E	
Panchayath	: Ranni- Perinad
Village	: Ranni- Perinad
District	: Pathanamthitta
River Basin	: Pamba	
River : Kakkad ar	
Release from Dam to river	: Kakkad ar	
Year of completion	: 2012	
Name of Project	: Ranni- Perinad SHEP	
Type of Dam	Concrete – Gravity
Classification	: Weir
Maximum Water Level (MWL)	EL 22.10 m
Full Reservoir Level ( FRL)	EL 18.10 m
Storage at FRL	1.0 Mm3
Height from deepest foundation	9.35 m
Length	: 124 m	
Spillway	: Ungated – Overflow section
Crest Level	EL 18.10 m
River Outlet	: Not provided

Ranni Perinad Small Hydro Electric Project
This project is a tailrace scheme to the Maniyar project, operated by M/s Carborandum Universal. Tail race discharge after power generation, water from the power station is released to the Pamba River.

References

Purpose of Project	Hydro Power

Dams in Kerala
Dams completed in 2012